Wonder Lake also called Deenaalee Bene'  (Lower Tanana: Khuy-tenamena') is a lake located in Denali National Park and Preserve in Alaska.

References

Lakes of Alaska
Denali National Park and Preserve
Tanana Athabaskans